Bramwith railway station was a small station on the South Yorkshire Railway's line between Doncaster and Thorne. It served the village of Kirk Bramwith, near Doncaster, South Yorkshire, England. The original line followed closely the canal bank coming close to the village.

The original station was opened with the line on 7 July 1856 and closed on 1 October 1866. With the new "straightened" line being further from the village this station was not resited.

References 
The South Yorkshire Railway, D.L.Franks. Turntable Enterprises, 1971. 
The Railways of South Yorkshire, C.T.Goode, Dalesman Publishing. 

Disused railway stations in Doncaster
Former South Yorkshire Railway stations
Railway stations in Great Britain opened in 1856
Railway stations in Great Britain closed in 1866